Archanthemis is a genus of flowering plants belonging to the family Asteraceae.

Its native range is Eastern Europe to Central Asia and Caucasus.

Species:

Archanthemis calcarea 
Archanthemis fruticulosa 
Archanthemis marschalliana 
Archanthemis trotzkiana

References

Asteraceae
Asteraceae genera